Life with Father is a 1947 Technicolor American comedy film adapted from the 1939 play of the same name, which was inspired by the autobiography of stockbroker and The New Yorker essayist Clarence Day.

It tells the true story of Day and his family in the 1880s. His father, Clarence Sr., wants to be master of his house, but finds his wife, Vinnie, and his children ignoring him until they start making demands for him to change his life. The story draws largely on Clarence Sr.'s stubborn, sometimes ill-tempered nature and Vinnie's insistence that Clarence Sr. be baptized.  It stars William Powell and Irene Dunne as Clarence Sr. and his wife, supported by Elizabeth Taylor, Edmund Gwenn, ZaSu Pitts, Jimmy Lydon and Martin Milner.

Plot
Stockbroker Clarence Day is the benevolent curmudgeon of his 1880s New York City household, striving to make it function as efficiently as his Wall Street office but usually failing. His wife Vinnie is the real head of the household. In keeping with Day's actual family, all the children (all boys) are redheads. The anecdotal story encompasses such details as Clarence's attempts to find a new maid, a romance between his oldest son Clarence Jr. and pretty out-of-towner Mary Skinner, a plan by Clarence Jr. and his younger brother John to make easy money selling patent medicines, Clarence's general contempt for the era's political corruption and the trappings of organized religion, and Vinnie's push to get him baptized so he can go to heaven.

Cast

Production
The movie was adapted by Donald Ogden Stewart from the 1939 play by Howard Lindsay and Russel Crouse, based on the 1935 autobiography by Clarence Day, Jr. Day had worked as a stockbroker and was an author and cartoonist for The New Yorker. It was directed by Michael Curtiz.

Due to the Motion Picture Production Code standards of the day, the play's last line (in response to a policeman asking Mr. Day where he is going) "I'm going to be baptized, dammit!" had to be rewritten for the film, with the final word omitted. Mr. Day's frequent outbursts of "Oh, God!" were changed to "Oh, gad!" for the same reason.

Reception
Leading film critics in 1947 gave Life with Father high marks, especially with regard to the quality of Warner Bros.' screen adaptation of the popular Broadway play and the quality of the cast's performances. The New York Times in its review directed special attention to William Powell's portrayal of Clarence Day:

Film Daily summarized Life with Father as "one of the finer examples of film making in Technicolor" that provides "a delightfully different insight into the human comedy of another day." Variety complimented Irene Dunne's restrained performance as Vinnie as well as the work of the film's supporting players and the production's cinematography and overall direction:

Box office
According to Warner Bros., the film earned them $5,057,000 in the U.S. and $1,398,000 in other markets, for a total of $6,455,000 against a production budget of $4,710,000.

Awards
Life with Father was nominated for Academy Awards for Best Actor in a Leading Role (William Powell), Best Art Direction-Set Decoration, Color (Robert M. Haas, George James Hopkins), Best Cinematography, Color and Best Music, Scoring of a Dramatic or Comedy Picture.

Copyright status
Through a clerical error, Life with Father was not renewed for copyright and fell into the public domain in 1975.

Warner Bros. (or United Artists, the former owner of pre-1950 Warner Bros. films) still owns the theatrical distribution and music rights to the film, but other companies have been able to release non-theatrical, public-domain versions.

References

External links

 
 
 
 
 
 

1947 films
1940s historical comedy films
American historical comedy films
1940s English-language films
Films scored by Max Steiner
Films about families
Films directed by Michael Curtiz
Films set in the 1880s
Films set in New York City
Warner Bros. films
Films with screenplays by Donald Ogden Stewart
1947 comedy films
1940s American films